Louise Allen (born January 7, 1962) is a retired American tennis player.

Allen attended Trinity University in San Antonio, Texas, where she was a four-time All-American (1981-1984) and won the 1983 NCAA Division I Women's Doubles Championship and the 1983 Pan American Games women's doubles, both times with partner Gretchen Rush. The same year, she received the Broderick Award (now the Honda Sports Award, awarded annually to the best collegiate athletes in 12 sports) for tennis. She graduated in 1984 with a Bachelor of Science degree in business administration.

Allen played in all four Grand Slam tournaments, with her best results coming in 1983, when she reached the third round at Wimbledon in singles and the US Open with doubles partner Gretchen Magers (née Rush). According to the Trinity University Hall of Fame, she won five singles and eight doubles titles in all. 

Allen retired in 1993. She was inducted into the North Carolina Tennis Hall of Fame and the Trinity University Hall of Fame.

References

1962 births
Living people
American female tennis players
Trinity Tigers women's tennis players
Pan American Games medalists in tennis
Pan American Games gold medalists for the United States
Tennis players at the 1983 Pan American Games